The 2014 Liga Nusantara Yogyakarta season is the first edition of Liga Nusantara Yogyakarta is a qualifying round of the 2014 Liga Nusantara.

The competition scheduled starts in May 2014.

Teams
Liga Nusantara Yogyakarta will be followed five clubs namely Sleman United, Persig Gunungkidul, Protaba Bantul, Gelora Handayani Gunungkidul and Persikup Kulonprogo.

Stadium and locations

League table

Result
PSSI sets the standard every team must play as many as 15 games in a span of five months in the regional round, each region should ideally have a minimum of nine participants. But, it is not can not be tricked, Liga Nusantaa Yogyakarta may be held in the format of three rounds. The first and second rounds held by sisteme home and away, while the third round was held at a neutral stadium.

Week 1-10

Week 11-15

References

Yogyakarta